Badamba is a Town and tehsil (block) of Cuttack district and a Vidhan Sabha constituency of Cuttack district, Odisha. There are 138 villages and 38 gram (panchayats) under the Baramba administrative division. Badamba is a beautiful historical place located in the middle of Mahanadi River and the mountain ranges. There are many various natural tourist attraction spots along with the ancient temples that attract tourists from far and wide for their beauty and amazing legends.

Baramba is part of the Baramba (Odisha Vidhan Sabha constituency) . which includes Baramba block and Narasinghpur block.

History
During the British Raj era, Baramba was the capital of Baramba State, one of several princely states of the Eastern States Agency.

The Bhattarika Temple, located in Sasanga village, Baramba, is believed to have been constructed between the 6th and the 16th century. The major festivals celebrated at this temple are Pana Sankranti in April, Akshaya Tritiya in May, and Dussehra in October.

References

Cuttack district